Crocus imperati is a species of flowering plant in the genus Crocus of the family Iridaceae, endemic to Italy.

References

imperati
Plants described in 1826